Stingray Radio is a Canadian radio broadcasting conglomerate owned by Stingray Group. It owns and operates 101 radio stations in Canada—making it the second-largest radio conglomerate in Canada behind Bell Media. It also owns two television stations in Lloydminster. The majority of its stations are situated in Newfoundland and Labrador, and Alberta. 

The company was founded in 1986 by Harold R. Steele as Newfoundland Capital Corporation Ltd. based in Halifax, Nova Scotia, later operating under the names Newcap Broadcasting and Newcap Radio. In October 2018, Newcap was acquired by Stingray. As a result of the acquisition, the Steele family became Stingray Group's largest third-party shareholder.

History

The company dates back to 1980. The group's Newfoundland and Labrador division, known as Steele Communications, included all but two of the full-power commercial stations in that province. In the past, Newfoundland Capital acted as a conglomerate with interests in diverse industries such as newspapers and freight transportation. The firm owns one asset unrelated to the broadcasting industry: a hotel in Corner Brook, the Glynmill Inn, which is operated as part of the Steele Hotels group which includes other properties held directly by the Steele family. The Steele family also has private holdings in other industries which are entirely outside of the Newcap corporate umbrella.

In 1986, NCCL received CRTC approval to acquire its first radio station, CHTN in Charlottetown, Prince Edward Island, from Northumberland Broadcasting Ltd. By 2008, Newcap would own over 70 radio stations, and flipped many radio stations from the AM band to the FM band.

In July 2008, Newcap announced a deal to trade CFDR in Halifax to Rogers Media in exchange for CIGM in Sudbury. Both stations were the sole remaining AM stations in their respective markets, and in both cases the current owner already had the maximum permitted number of FM stations in the applicable market, whereas the acquirer only had a single FM station. Both companies successfully applied to move the stations to FM as part of the trade. Newcap flipped CIGM Sudbury to FM on August 25, 2009, and Rogers flipped CFDR Halifax to FM on August 7, 2009.

On July 28, 2008, Newcap announced that it had a tentative deal to acquire 12 stations in Ontario from Haliburton Broadcasting Group, subject to CRTC approval, for $18.95 million. The company's application to acquire the Haliburton stations was formally published by the CRTC on November 13, 2008, but was subsequently withdrawn in January 2009. Newcap CEO Rob Steele indicated that in light of the credit market crisis, the company did not feel that it was the right time to increase its debt load.

In May 2011, Newcap announced that it was selling its two stations in Winnipeg, CKJS and CHNK-FM, to Evanov Communications; the sale was approved on October 24, 2011.

In January 2013, the company announced it was exploring a possible sale of its remaining broadcasting assets in Western Canada, consisting of 32 radio stations and two television stations, and six rebroadcasters associated with those stations. These stations are predominantly in Alberta (including several stations in the Lloydminster region on the Alberta/Saskatchewan border), except for two stations in British Columbia. The company announced in May 2013 it was no longer planning to sell its assets in Western Canada. If such a sale had occurred, Newcap suggested that the proceeds might be used to either fund acquisitions "closer to [Newcap's] base in Atlantic Canada", pay down debt, or return capital to shareholders.

On August 26, 2013, Newcap Radio announced it would acquire four former Astral Media radio stations in Toronto and Vancouver, including CHBM-FM, CKZZ-FM, CHHR-FM and CISL, along with Bell Media's CFXJ-FM, for $112 million. The deal was made in the wake of Bell Media's acquisition of Astral. The deal was approved by the CRTC on March 19, 2014 and the sale closed on March 31, 2014.

On April 25, 2017, Rogers Media announced its intent to acquire CISL from Newcap, who relaunched it as a Sportsnet Radio sports talk station with rights to the NHL's Vancouver Canucks.

On May 11, 2017, Newcap Radio announced its purchase of NL Broadcasting in Kamloops and its three stations, CHNL, CKRV-FM, and CJKC-FM.

On May 2, 2018, cable radio broadcaster Stingray Digital announced its intent to acquire Newcap Radio for $506 million. On October 23, 2018, the CRTC approved Stingray's application to acquire Newcap. The sale was completed just days later on October 26, 2018, with the Steele family holding the largest stake in the company besides its founders.

In January 2021, Stingray networked its rock stations in Atlantic Canada out of CFRQ-FM/Halifax, with all of them adopting similar Q branding and airing CFRQ's morning show, in addition to the existing networked evening show Rock of the Atlantic. In late-March 2021, the company underwent a restructuring of some of its staff and local program directors, which resulted in layoffs. On April 5, 2021, Stingray launched networked programming for its The Breeze-branded soft adult contemporary stations and its classic rock stations in western Canada. The Breeze introduced The Morning Breeze with Brad & Deb, which is networked out of CKUL-FM/Halifax and incorporates local inserts. Stingray also introduced the networked evening program Rock of the West (modelled after Rock of the Atlantic), which is hosted by Travis Currah of CIZZ-FM/Red Deer.

Assets

The following list is based on the Canadian Radio-television and Telecommunications Commission's media ownership charts as of January 26, 2013.

Television
 Lloydminster - CKSA-DT, CITL-DT

Radio

Newfoundland and Labrador
Baie Verte - CKIM
Carbonear - CHVO-FM
Channel-Port aux Basques - CFGN-FM
Churchill Falls - CFLC-FM
Clarenville - CKVO, VOCM-FM-1, CKLN-FM
Corner Brook - CFCB, CKXX-FM
Deer Lake - CFDL-FM
Gander - CKGA, CKXD-FM
Grand Falls-Windsor - CKCM, CKXG-FM
Happy Valley-Goose Bay - CFLN-FM
Marystown - CHCM-FM
Port au Choix - CFNW
St. Andrew's - CFCV-FM
St. Anthony - CFNN-FM
St. John's - VOCM, VOCM-FM, CJYQ, CKIX-FM
Stephenville - CFSX, CKXX-FM-1
Wabush - CFLW-FM

Nova Scotia
Halifax - CFRQ-FM, CKUL-FM
Kentville - CIJK-FM
New Glasgow - CKEZ-FM, CKEC-FM.
Sydney - CHRK-FM, CKCH-FM

Prince Edward Island
Charlottetown - CHTN-FM, CKQK-FM

New Brunswick
Fredericton - CFRK-FM, CIHI-FM
Miramichi - CHHI-FM
Moncton - CJMO-FM, CJXL-FM
Saint John - CHNI-FM

Ontario
Ottawa - CIHT-FM, CILV-FM
Sudbury - CHNO-FM, CIGM-FM
Toronto - CFXJ-FM, CHBM-FM

Alberta
Athabasca - CKBA-FM
Blairmore - CJPR-FM
Bonnyville - CJEG-FM
Brooks - CIBQ-FM, CIXF-FM
Calgary - CFXL-FM, CKMP-FM
Camrose - CFCW, CFCW-FM
Cold Lake - CJXK-FM
Drumheller - CKDQ, CHOO-FM
Edmonton - CIRK-FM, CKRA-FM
Edson - CFXE-FM
High Prairie - CKVH-FM
Hinton - CFHI-FM, CFXH-FM
Lac La Biche - CILB-FM
Lloydminster - CKSA-FM, CILR-FM (unlicensed travellers' information station)
Red Deer - CKGY-FM, CIZZ-FM
St. Paul - CHSP-FM
Slave Lake - CHSL-FM
Stettler - CKSQ-FM
Wainwright - CKKY-FM, CKWY-FM
Westlock - CKWB-FM
Wetaskiwin - CKJR
Whitecourt - CFXW-FM

British Columbia
 Kamloops - CHNL, CKRV-FM, CJKC-FM
 Kelowna - CKKO-FM
 Penticton - CIGV-FM
 Vancouver - CHLG-FM, CKZZ-FM

3937844 Canada Inc.
The numbered company 3937844 Canada Inc., a partnership between Newcap and Standard Broadcasting, was the licensee for most of the Alberta stations listed above from 2002, when Standard acquired the stations from Telemedia, until 2007, when Newcap bought out Standard's share of the stations.

References

External links
Stingray Radio
History of Newcap Inc. - Canadian Communications Foundation

Companies based in Halifax, Nova Scotia
Entertainment companies established in 1980
Mass media companies established in 1980
1986 establishments in Nova Scotia
Companies formerly listed on the Toronto Stock Exchange
Stingray Group